Erie High School, or EHS, is a public four-year high school located at 435 6th Avenue in Erie, Illinois, a village of Whiteside County, Illinois, in the Midwestern United States. EHS is part of Erie Community Unit School District 1, which serves the communities of Erie and Fenton, and includes Erie Middle School, Erie Elementary School, and Erie Preschool. The campus is 25 miles southwest of Sterling, Illinois and serves a mixed village and rural residential community. The school lies within the Sterling micropolitan statistical area.

Academics
In 2009, Erie High School did not make Adequate Yearly Progress, with 49% of students meeting standards, on the Prairie State Achievement Examination, a state test that is part of the No Child Left Behind Act. The school's average high school graduation rate between 1999-2009 was 94%.

Erie High School provides courses in the academic departments of:
Business
Computer Education
Driver Education
English
Fine Arts
Home Economics
Industrial Technology
Math
Miscellaneous
Physical Education and Health
Science
Social Studies
Spanish

Athletics
Erie High School competes in the Three Rivers Conference and is a member school in the Illinois High School Association. Its mascot is the Cardinals. The school has no state championships on record in team athletics or activities. Erie High School co-ops with Prophetstown High School for the majority of its athletics.

References

External links
 
 Erie Community Unit School District 1

Public high schools in Illinois
Schools in Whiteside County, Illinois